Christmas is a 2004 album by Chris Isaak released on Warner Bros. Records.

Track listing
All tracks composed by Chris Isaak; except where indicated

"Rudolph the Red-Nosed Reindeer" (Johnny Marks) – 2:12
"Have Yourself a Merry Little Christmas" (Hugh Martin, Ralph Blane) – 3:10
"Santa Claus Is Coming to Town" (J. Fred Coots, Haven Gillespie) – 2:30
"Washington Square" – 3:22
"Blue Christmas" (Bill Hayes, Jay Johnson) – 2:20
"The Christmas Song" (Mel Tormé, Robert Wells) – 2:47
"Hey Santa!" – 2:43
"Let It Snow" (Sammy Cahn, Jule Styne) – 2:29
"Christmas on TV" – 2:19
"Pretty Paper" (Willie Nelson) – 2:33
"White Christmas" (Irving Berlin) – 2:32
"Mele Kalikimaka" (Robert Alex Anderson) – 1:56
"Brightest Star" – 3:03
"Last Month of the Year" (Traditional) – 2:14
"Gotta Be Good" – 2:42
"Auld Lang Syne" (Traditional) – 1:09

Australian edition bonus tracks
"I'll Be Home for Christmas" (Kim Gannon, Walter Kent, Buck Ram) – 2:48
"Santa Bring My Baby Back" (Claude Demetrius, Aaron Schroeder)– 2:12

Personnel
Chris Isaak - vocals, guitar
Hershel Yatovitz - guitar, vocals
Rowland Salley - bass, vocals
Kenney Dale Johnson - drums, vocals
with:
Stevie Nicks - vocals, percussion
Jamie Muhoberac, Jimmy Pugh, Mark Isham, Patrick Warren, Rafael Padilla, Robin DiMaggio, Scott Plunkett - additional musicians
Bob Joyce, David Joyce, Jon Joyce, Walt Harrah - backing vocals
Technical
Mark Needham - recording, mixing
Michael Tsay - photography

Charts

Sales and certifications

References

Chris Isaak albums
Reprise Records albums
2004 Christmas albums
Christmas albums by American artists
Rock Christmas albums